Alton Abbey is an Anglican Benedictine monastery (founded in 1895) in the village of Beech, near Alton, Hampshire, England. The abbey is not far from one of Hampshire's highest points, King's Hill (218 m). The community was founded by the Revd Charles Plomer Hopkins in 1884, as the "Society of Saint Paul", in Rangoon (Burma) and Calcutta (India) to work with destitute or distressed merchant seafarers and their chaplains.

Noted for its beauty and tranquility, Alton Abbey has been described in The Times as "the best-kept secret in the Church of England",

History
The community was founded by the Revd Charles Plomer Hopkins in 1884, as the Society of Saint Paul, in Rangoon (Burma) and Calcutta (India) to work with destitute or distressed merchant seafarers and their chaplains. The first house was opened in 1894 in Barry Dock, South Wales (now closed) to continue this work.

A quieter house was needed and the site in Beech was acquired in 1895. This was initially used to care for retired or ill seamen in temporary wood and metal buildings. The current buildings were designed by Sir Charles Nicholson, using Tintern Abbey as a model. The first monks did much of the construction using local flint, including a flint and brick Gatehouse (1901). The Abbey church, designed by John Cyril Hawes (flint and brick, built in 1901 to 1907), is dedicated to "Our Lady and Saint John". Hawes also designed the gatehouse. Having observed the Rule of St Benedict from 1893 the community formally adopted it on 28 January 1981.

In 1989 another charity undertook the society's work with seafarers. The community now runs retreats and courses for the public.

Monks
The priority of the monks is the offering of the Liturgy of the Hours and the Conventual Mass. Part of the day is set aside for work in the bakery making communion bread), in the gardens, in the retreat house, writing (painting) icons, or making incense. Those who wish to join the community spend time as an aspirant, postulant and novice while they consider their commitment. With the agreement of the other monks, they make Benedictine Vows of Stability, Conversion of Life, and Obedience for a period of three years. After that three-year period is complete, they may make lifelong vows with the agreement of the community.

In September 2010, Dom William Hughes was elected third Abbot of Alton but in 2013 he resigned and the Rt Revd Dom Giles Hill resumed his duties as abbot. As of 2022, there five professed members of the community.

Oblates 
Oblates are men (lay and ordained, over 18 years of age), who join the community, but live outside the monastery. They commit to follow life rules similar to those followed by the monks, based on the Rule of St Benedict and adapted for their specific life circumstances.

Companions 
Companions are women and men who make a commitment to regular worship with the monks, either at the Abbey or in their life outside.

Prayer and church services
Except for those times when the whole monastery closes for retreat, there are six services open to the public each day: Morning Prayer (Matins and Lauds), Conventual Mass, Mid-day Office, Evening Prayer (Vespers) and Compline.

References in literature
A thinly disguised version of Alton Abbey appears in Sinister Street (1913) by Sir Compton Mackenzie.

References

External links 
Alton Abbey website

Anglican orders and communities
Benedictine monasteries in England
Alton, Hampshire
1895 establishments in England
19th-century Christian monasteries
Abbeys in Hampshire
Anglican monasteries in the United Kingdom
19th-century churches in the United Kingdom